Karen Lewis-Archer (12 October 1974 – 14 December 2016) was a Scottish Paralympic athlete who competed internationally for Great Britain at international track and field competitions, she competed at the 2000 and 2004 Summer Paralympics. She was one of Scotland's best female wheelchair athletes when she competed and has won multiple World and European medals.

Lewis-Archer died on 14 December 2016 following health complications related to cancer.

References

1974 births
2016 deaths
People from Carluke
Paralympic athletes of Great Britain
Scottish female wheelchair racers
Athletes (track and field) at the 2000 Summer Paralympics
Athletes (track and field) at the 2004 Summer Paralympics
Medalists at the World Para Athletics Championships